KQSL (channel 8) is a religious television station in Cloverdale, California, United States, which is a broadcast partner of the Total Living Network. The station is owned by One Ministries, Inc., a 501(c)(3) non-profit organization based in Santa Rosa, California. KQSL's transmitter is located west of Laytonville, California.

History
KQSL debuted in 1990 as KFWU, originally licensed to Fort Bragg, California and owned by California Oregon Broadcasting. As a satellite of ABC affiliate KAEF-TV in Eureka, the station was sold to Lamco Communications (along with KAEF) in 1995. It was then sold to Sainte Limited in 1996, and to Pappas Telecasting Companies in 1997, at which point KFWU became a satellite of KTNC-TV in Concord (however, at first, KFWU was considered the main station and KTNC the satellite). It became KUNO-TV in 2003.

On November 7, 2008, KUNO was taken silent due to financial troubles. In May 2008, Pappas filed for bankruptcy protection. On November 5, 2008, KUNO returned to on-air operation just under one year of having been silent with its analog facilities on channel 8 and pre-transition DTV facility on channel 15.

On January 16, 2009, it was announced that several Pappas stations, including KTNC and KUNO, would be sold to New World TV Group after the sale received United States bankruptcy court approval.

On June 12, 2009, KUNO signed off of its analog signal and completed its move to digital. Both KUNO and KDSL-CA (licensed to Ukiah, California) were transferred to Titan TV Broadcast Group on October 15, 2009. KUNO was taken silent again on October 31, 2009 and was subsequently sold to Jeff Chang in July 2010 for $100,000. The sale to Jeff Chang was completed on October 6, 2010, and he got the station back on the air just under one year of it being silent. If not for Jeff Chang relaunching KQSL's on-air operation, its license would have been revoked.

Upon taking over, Chang dropped the KTNC simulcast in favor of Retro Television Network programming, under new call letters. In October 2010, he call signed the station as KBQR; in June 2011, the station was given new a new call sign again, this time to KQSL. The KQSL call sign had previously belonged to an LPFM construction permit in Penngrove, California, belonging to One Ministries, Inc., and coincidentally One Ministries, Inc. would become the future owner of KQSL in 2018.

KQSL joined TheCoolTV in September 2011; the network regarded the station as its San Francisco affiliate. In 2012, KQSL dropped TheCoolTV and picked up FilmOn programming. The station dropped FilmOn in early 2013, but carried a schedule of classic television shows and entertainment news magazines and specials until 2016. After this, it began broadcasting Jimmy Swaggart's Sonlife Broadcasting Network.

Jeff Chang was successful in getting KQSL onto Dish Network, AT&T U-verse and DirecTV throughout the San Francisco Bay Area after getting the station back on the air. Video fiber circuits were installed to provide Dish, U-Verse and DirecTV feeds of KQSL.

On August 1, 2017, KQSL reverted to independent programming. The Sonlife affiliation had transferred to KCNS. On January 15, 2018, KQSL began carrying Total Living Network (TLN) programming as a simulcast of TLN programming carried on Comcast cable channel 138 in Chicago. TLN also was carried on a West Coast feed until April 16, 2019 on KTLN, licensed to Novato, California. KQSL began carrying TLN's West Coast feed, TLN West, on April 6, 2019.

On July 11, 2018, One Ministries, Inc. completed its purchase of KQSL from Jeff Chang for $2 million. K11WP-D was also sold to Jeff Chang for $1 as part of the KQSL transaction. The broadcast partnership with TLN was retained. One Ministries, Inc. had closed a deal to sell three LPTV stations to HC2 Holdings for $2.15 million one day prior to having consummating the deal to purchase KQSL. One Ministries also owns and operates 5 translators of KQSL in Northern California and Reno, Nevada, as well as low-power TV station KKRM-CD in Chico which has a series of translators throughout Northern California, most of which air KQSL on their .8 digital subchannel. A One Ministries-owned station, KQTA-LD in San Francisco, airs KQSL on its .2 subchannel. In addition to airing programming from TLN West, KQSL also airs locally originated programming daily from midnight to 6 a.m. and Saturdays from midnight to 5 p.m.

KQSL began airing local news for Northern California and Southern Oregon in December 2018. The local news program, from Medford, Oregon-licensed KDSO-LD and KDOV-LD, is called Mornings on the Dove which aired 6 to 8 a.m. weekdays initially and was subsequently moved to noon to 1 p.m. weekdays in April 2019. This program airs live on KKPM-CD and its translators on their primary channel which airs TheDove, the religious channel where it originates.

KQSL upgraded to 1080i HD picture quality in March 2019 on Dish Network and April 2019 on DirecTV.

According to FCC database, as of January 12, 2021, KQSL changed its city of license to Cloverdale, California (in Sonoma County).

Technical information

Subchannels
The station's digital signal is multiplexed:

Translators
KQSL is rebroadcast on the following low-power translators in Northern California and Nevada.
 K02QP-D RF Channel 2, Virtual 45 Chowchilla
 K15FJ-D RF Channel 15, Virtual 15 Lakeport
 K06QL-D RF Channel 6, Virtual 15 Modesto
 K02QW-D RF Channel 2, Virtual 13 Reno, NV
 KEVO-LD RF Channel 16, Virtual 40 Reno, NV

KQSL is rebroadcast on a digital subchannel of the following low-power translators in Northern California and Nevada.
 KKRM-LD RF Channel 11, Virtual 11.8 Chico
 K21OY-D RF Channel 21, Virtual 21.8 Chico
 K14TG-D RF Channel 14, Virtual 17.1 Monterey
 KFMY-LD RF Channel 6, Virtual 15.2 Petaluma
 K16IW-D RF Channel 16, Virtual 16.8 Redding
 KRDT-CD RF Channel 23, Virtual 23.8 Redding
 K51LK-D RF Channel 51, Virtual 51.8 Redding
 KZHD-LD RF Channel 22, Virtual 15.2 Rohnert Park
 K04RS-D RF Channel 4, Virtual 3.1 Salinas
 KURK-LD RF Channel 3, Virtual 3.4 San Francisco
 KQTA-LD RF Channel 14, Virtual 15.2 San Francisco
 KQSL-LD RF Channel 4, Virtual 17.4 San Rafael
 KUKR-LD RF Channel 26, Virtual 27.4 Santa Rosa
 KKPM-CD RF Channel 28, Virtual 28.8 Yuba City
 KYUB-LD RF Channel 15, Virtual 15.8 Yuba City

Cable and satellite availability

References

QSL
Religious television stations in the United States
Daystar (TV network) affiliates
Television channels and stations established in 1990
1990 establishments in California
Sonoma County, California